Shahrigh is town and union council of Sibi District in the Balochistan province of Pakistan. It is located at 30°11'23N 67°42'34E  and has an altitude of 1217 m (3996 ft).

References

Populated places in Sibi District
Union councils of Balochistan, Pakistan

See also
 Mehergarh
 Bibi Nani
 khajjak
 Dehpal
 Marghazani
 Kurak
 Sibi Mela